Porudzie  is a village in the administrative district of Gmina Sadowie, within Opatów County, Świętokrzyskie Voivodeship, in south-central Poland.

The village has a population of 170.

References

Porudzie